Santander Cycles Leicester is an electric bicycle sharing scheme covering the city of Leicester, United Kingdom. The scheme is a joint venture between Leicester City Council, the operator Ride On, Enzen Global as delivery partner and additional funding provided through sponsorship with Santander.

After a small-scale launch to key workers, the scheme was publicly launched on 14 April 2021 with 13 docking stations. A further 35 docking stations are planned.

The cycle scheme is not to be confused with Santander Cycles which is run by Transport for London and only caters to the London area.

Usage
To use the scheme, online registration is required and the purchase of a plan. Pay as you go, monthly and annual memberships are all available. Once a plan is activated, bikes can be reserved and unlocked at the docks using the dedicated smartphone application.

Docking stations

City centre
 Bonners Ln
 Charles Street - City Hall
 Charles Street - Haymarket Bus Stn
 Foundry Sq - Morningside Arena
 Gallowtree Gate
 Great Central St
 Greyfriars
 Haymarket
 Leicester Railway Station
 Peacock Lane
 Rutland Street - LCB Depot
 St.Margaret's Bus Station
 The Magazine
 Welford Rd - Royal Infirmary A & E
 Wellington Street
 Wharf St North

Wider city
 Almond Rd - Leicester College
 Aylestone Recreation Ground
 Belgrave Roundabout
 Briton Street
 Carlton Park - Santander HQ
 County Hall
 Exploration Drive - The Dock
 Glenfield Hospital - South Entrance
 Glenfield Hospital Main Entrance
 Granville Rd - De Montfort Hall
 Lancaster Rd - Fire Stn
 Leicester University - Main Campus
 London Road Tankie Smith
 Malabar Rd
 Maynard Rd
 National Space Centre
 Queens Road
 Saffron Lane
 Sparkenhoe ST - Health Centre
 Stephenson Dr
 Tudor Road-Paget Road
 Upperton Road, Great Central Way
 Walkers Deli & Sausage – Dysart Way
 Western Boulevard - Liberty Statue

References

External links
 Official site www.rideonleicester.com

Transport in Leicester
Bicycle sharing in the United Kingdom
2021 establishments in England
Community_bicycle_programs